The Louisiana State Treasurer is an elected constitutional officer in the executive branch of the state government of Louisiana responsible for overseeing the financial operations of state government. The state treasurer is an elected position, with four year terms. The Louisiana State Treasurer is John Schroder, a Republican.

Past state treasurers Mary Landrieu and John Kennedy were subsequently elected to the United States Senate.

Partial list
Antoine Dubuclet, 1868–1878
Edward A. Burke, 1878–1888
A. P. Tugwell, 1936–1968
Mary Evelyn Parker, 1968–1987
Mary Landrieu, 1987–1996
Ken Duncan, 1996–2000
John Kennedy, 2000–2017
Ron Henson, 2017
John Schroder, 2017–present

References

External links